"Andalucia" is a single from Doves' best-of compilation, titled The Places Between: The Best of Doves. The song was released as a promo single on 1 March 2010. The single received its first airplay on Zane Lowe's BBC Radio 1 show on 3 March 2010, and again on 4 March 2010, on Steve Lamacq's BBC 6 Music radio show Roundtable. The song was then released as a digital download-only single on 5 April 2010, the same day the compilation was released. It was the band's final single before their ten-year hiatus. "Andalucia" also marks the first Doves single release not available commercially on a physical format.

A music video was produced for the song, filmed in Granada and directed by Soup Collective and photographer Percy Dean, but was not included on the DVD for The Places Between. nthWORD said of the music video, "It's very possible that the video for Doves' "Andalucia" will start your day off on the right feet. Dig the old man." A video of Jimi Goodwin and Jez Williams performing an acoustic version of "Andalucia" at the Jodrell Bank Observatory in Cheshire premiered on The Guardian's website on 4 April 2010.

Track listings

Credits
 "Andalucia" produced by Doves and Dan Austin.
 Mixed by Dave Bascombe.
 Violin by Belinda Hammond.
 Art direction by Rick Myers and Art-Utility.

References

2010 singles
Doves (band) songs
Songs written by Jez Williams
Songs written by Jimi Goodwin
Songs written by Andy Williams (Doves)
2010 songs